The Watkins–Coleman House was designed and built by John Watkins in 1869 in Midway, Utah. Watkins, trained as an architect in England, emigrated to the United States in 1856 to house his polygamist family. In 1903 the house was sold to Henry T. Coleman. The -story Carpenter Gothic house was built in red brick, with extensive scroll-cut ornamentation on the eaves. Corners are accented with contrasting white sandstone quoins. The steeply-pitched roof is covered in green-stained wood shingles.

The Watkins–Coleman House was placed on the National Register of Historic Places on May 14, 1971.

References

External links
 
 

Houses on the National Register of Historic Places in Utah
Houses completed in 1869
Houses in Wasatch County, Utah
Historic American Buildings Survey in Utah
Carpenter Gothic architecture in Utah
1869 establishments in Utah Territory
National Register of Historic Places in Wasatch County, Utah